The 1975 Svenska Cupen final took place on 8 May 1975 at Malmö Stadion in Malmö. The match was contested by Allsvenskan sides Malmö FF and Djurgårdens IF. Djurgården played their first final since 1951 and their second in total, Malmö FF played their third consecutive final and their 11th final in total. Malmö FF won their 9th title with a 1–0 victory.

Match details

External links
Svenska Cupen at svenskfotboll.se

1975
Svenska Cupen
Malmö FF matches
Djurgårdens IF Fotboll matches
May 1975 sports events in Europe
Sports competitions in Malmö
1970s in Malmö